Biedermannsdorf (Central Bavarian: Biedamaunsduaf) is a town in the district of Mödling in the Austrian state of Lower Austria.

Geography
The municipality lies in the Vienna basin east of the A2 Autobahn. The Laxenburg-Biedermannsdorf train station lies on the south side of the municipality, and the Vienna–Pottendorf–Neustadt line runs through the east end.

The Mödlingbach runs through the municipality.

History
The first settlement in the area was made around 7000 BCE, and archaeological evidence has been found dating back to 5000 BCE.
 
In Roman times, Biedermannsdorf, belonged to the district of Vindobona. In 1999–2000, remains of a road station from the first centuries CE were discovered.
 
The first mention of the place in historical records dates from 1170/80, at which time it belonged to the Liechtenstein and Perchtoldsdorf families.
 
Like all municipalities in the area, Biedermannsdorf suffered under the wars of religion, the Turkish occupation, and the plague. In 1797, the Vienna-Neustadt Canal was built with a branch leading to the brickyards in Bedermannsdorf.
 
The area was bombed in World War II because the Ostmark airplane factory was nearby. The municipality was incorporated into Greater Vienna from 1938 to 1954, after which it again became an independent municipality.

Population

References

Cities and towns in Mödling District